Virgil Severns (born May 22, 1929) is a former male high jumper from the United States, who competed in the 1940s and 1950s. He is best known for winning the gold medal at the inaugural Pan American Games in 1951. Severns set his personal best in the men's high jump event (2.038 metres) on 1950-04-01 at a meet in Austin, Texas.

Achievements

References
Profile

1929 births
Living people
American male high jumpers
Athletes (track and field) at the 1951 Pan American Games
Pan American Games medalists in athletics (track and field)
Pan American Games gold medalists for the United States
Medalists at the 1951 Pan American Games